The Beacon is a mixed-use development located on a  site on Bergen Hill, a crest of the Hudson Palisades and one of the highest geographical points in Jersey City, Hudson County, New Jersey, United States. The Beacon, which occupies the Jersey City Medical Center's rehabilitated original complex, creates the northeastern corner of the Bergen Lafayette Section and is just east of McGinley Square.

Jersey City Medical Center moved to the site in 1882, and the complex was expanded in stages through the mid-20th century. Metrovest Equities was designated the redeveloper of the property in the first decade of the 21st century. The redevelopment stalled after a down-turn in the market, but was completed by April 2016.

The complex is listed on the national and New Jersey registers of historic places.

History
During the Great Depression, new buildings were added as a Works Progress Administration project secured by Mayor Frank Hague, The Jersey City Medical Center included such architectural and designer trappings as marble walls, terrazzo floors, etched glass, decorative moldings and glittering chandeliers, and had one of the most famous maternity wards in the country – the Margaret Hague Maternity Hospital. 

During the 1950s, JCMC was the home of the medical school of Seton Hall University, which later became the New Jersey Medical School, now located in Newark. Oversized and understaffed, in 1988 the hospital became a private, non-profit organization. In 1994, the State of New Jersey designated it as a regional trauma center, and in the late 1990s it was approved as a core teaching affiliate of Mount Sinai School of Medicine. 
              
Metrovest Equities was designated the redeveloper of the property in 2003 and officially closed on it in 2005.  The developer converted the ten federally landmarked, Art Deco buildings in the largest residential restoration project in the country and the largest in the history of New Jersey, with an expected cost estimated at $350
million.

Use of existing infrastructure and restoration
The existing buildings are listed on the New Jersey Register of Historic Places and National Register of Historic Places. 

The first buildings to be renovated were the Rialto and Capitol buildings, which now serve as residential condominiums and entertainment spaces. The restoration of these two buildings alone was estimated over $133 million and it took over four years to complete. In 2009, the New Jersey Department of Environmental Protection Historic Preservation Office awarded an Outstanding Contribution of Excellence Award to the contractors and architects and others who participated in the restoration of the Rialto and Capitol buildings.

Popular culture

Both the exterior and the interior of the building was used as a filming location for the 1994 Robert Redford film Quiz Show, depicts the 1950s quiz show scandals. Sections of the interior of Murdoch Hall were used because they resembled the art deco backdrop of Manhattan's Rockefeller Center where the game show Twenty-One was filmed. Approximately $25,000 was spent to renovate the neglected building in order to render it suitable for filming.

Richard Price 1992 novel, Clockers, makes a thinly veiled reference to the abandoned Margaret Hague Maternity Hospital on Clifton Place. A "chronicler of Hudson County's underbelly", Price describes how vandals stripped the hospital interior of artifacts to be sold for scrap.

See also
List of neighborhoods in Jersey City, New Jersey
List of Registered Historic Places in Hudson County, New Jersey
Historic districts in Hudson County, New Jersey
Whitlock Cordage
Hudson and Manhattan Railroad Powerhouse
Dixon Mills

References

Further reading

NJCU:Jersey City A to Z:JCMC
USA Today: Model of Urban Future
NY Times: Art Deco Grandeur Restored

External links

The Beacon Website

Neighborhoods in Jersey City, New Jersey
Buildings and structures in Jersey City, New Jersey
Historic districts in Hudson County, New Jersey
Residential skyscrapers in Jersey City, New Jersey
Jersey City Medical Center
Works Progress Administration in New Jersey
Apartment buildings in Jersey City, New Jersey
Hospitals in Hudson County, New Jersey
New Jersey Register of Historic Places
Hospital buildings on the National Register of Historic Places in New Jersey
National Register of Historic Places in Hudson County, New Jersey